Alfred Clement Borthwick "Alf" Maiden  (21 August 192230 July 1979) was a senior Australian public servant and businessman. He was Secretary of the Department of Primary Industry between October 1962 and December 1968.

Life and career
Alfred Maiden was born on 21 August 1922 in Taree, New South Wales. At 16 he began a four-year program at New England University College, graduating in history and economics with honours after just three years. He joined the army in 1941, at 19, and during World War II was positioned in New Guinea.

In October 1962, Maiden was appointed Secretary of the Department of Primary Industry   He resigned from the role in 1968 to become managing director of the International Wool Secretariat in London.

Alf Maiden died on 30 July 1979. His death was widely mourned, including by then Prime Minister of Australia, Malcolm Fraser—Maiden had been Secretary of the Department of Primary Industry when Fraser had been Minister of the Department in 1967.

Awards
Maiden was made a Commander of the Order of the British Empire in June 1965 while Secretary of the Department of Primary Industry.

References

1922 births
1979 deaths
Australian public servants
Australian Commanders of the Order of the British Empire
University of New England (Australia) alumni
People from Taree
Australian military personnel of World War II
Military personnel from New South Wales
20th-century Australian businesspeople